Hyle was a town of ancient Cyprus, with a sanctuary of Apollo, whence Apollo was called Hyletes (or Hylates).

Its site is unlocated.

References

Populated places in ancient Cyprus
Former populated places in Cyprus
Lost ancient cities and towns